This list of Ports and harbours in Namibia details the ports, harbours around the coast of Namibia.

List of ports and harbours in Namibia

References

Ports
Port cities and towns in Namibia
Namibia